Mahoning may refer to:

Communities
 Mahoning, Ohio, an unincorporated community in Portage County
 Mahoning County, Ohio
 Mahoning Township, Armstrong County, Pennsylvania
 Mahoning Township, Carbon County, Pennsylvania
 Mahoning Township, Lawrence County, Pennsylvania
 Mahoning Township, Montour County, Pennsylvania

Watercourses
 Mahoning Creek (Allegheny River), a tributary of the Allegheny River in Pennsylvania
 Mahoning Creek (Lehigh River), a tributary of the Lehigh River in Lehigh County
 Mahoning Creek (Susquehanna River), a tributary of the Susquehanna River in Montour County
 Mahoning River, a tributary of the Beaver River in Ohio and Pennsylvania

Other uses
 Mahoning Drive-In Theater, a drive-in theater in Lehighton, Pennsylvania
 Mahoning Valley, northeast Ohio and northwest Pennsylvania